Jumpworld is the fourth studio album by American jazz singer Cassandra Wilson. It was released in 1990 by JMT label.

Track listing
 "Woman on the Edge" (Cassandra Wilson) – 5:02
 "Domination Switch" (Steve Coleman, Wilson) – 6:20
 "Phase Jump" (Coleman, Wilson) – 1:40
 "Lies" (Wilson) – 3:48
 "Grand System Masters" (Graham Haynes) – 4:37
 "Jump World" (Kirth Atkins, Steve Coleman, James Moore, Wilson) – 4:40
 "Love Phases Dimensions" (Kevin Bruce Harris, Rod Williams, Wilson) – 5:27
 "Whirlwind Soldier" (Wilson) – 4:52
 "Warm Spot" (Kevin Bruce Harris, Mark Johnson, Williams, Wilson) – 6:24
 "Dancing in Dream Time" (David Gilmore, Wilson) – 3:53
 "Rock This Calling" (Coleman, Wilson) – 3:38

Personnel
Cassandra Wilson – vocals
David Gilmore – guitar
Rod Williams – piano, keyboards
Kevin Bruce Harris – bass
Mark Johnson – drums
Lonnie Plaxico – bass
Gary Thomas – saxophone
Steve Coleman – saxophone
Greg Osby – saxophone
Robin Eubanks – trombone
Graham Haynes – trumpet

References

1990 albums
Cassandra Wilson albums
JMT Records albums